Níall McNelis is an Irish Labour Party politician. He was Mayor of Galway from 2018 to 2019.

Political career
McNelis was first elected to Galway City Council in 2009 in the Galway City West ward, and kept his seat in the 2014 and 2019 elections. He served as the Deputy Mayor of Galway in 2016, and was the Mayor of the city from 2018 to 2019.

McNelis stood for election in the 2020 Irish general election in the Galway West constituency, but was not elected, polling 2.6% first preferences
and being eliminated on the fourth count.
Current membership includes:
Member of Galway City Council.
Chairperson of Economic, Culture and Community SPC.
Chairperson City Joint Policing Committee.
Member of North West Regional Authority.
Member of City Planning SPC.
Member of Board Leisureland.
Chairperson Board of mental health charity Lets Get Talking.
Member of board Claddagh Watch, water safety in City.
Member of Regional Drugs Taskforce committee.
Member of Galway City Alcohol Taskforce.
Chairperson Galway City Tidy Towns.
Member of Galway Chamber of Commerce and Industry.
Former member of European Union Committee of Regions.
Former Governor GMIT Galway Mayo Institute of Technology.
Former Chairperson of GTI Galway Technical Institute.

Personal life
McNelis runs a jewellery business in Galway city and is married with two children.

In September 2018, McNelis intervened to help a woman being assaulted by a man on Wolfe Tone Bridge. McNelis was assaulted for his intervention, with the perpetrator later being charged.

References

Mayors of Galway
Living people
Year of birth missing (living people)
Local councillors in Galway (city)
Politicians from County Galway